Óscar Pavel Becerra Tiznado (born 14 February 1994, in Zapopan, Jalisco) is a Mexican professional footballer who currently plays for U. de C.

External links

 

Living people
1994 births
Association football defenders
Mineros de Zacatecas players
Ascenso MX players
People from Zapopan, Jalisco
Footballers from Jalisco
Mexican footballers